Mauricio Aimar Cuevas (born February 10, 2003) is an American professional soccer player who plays as a defender for Challenger Pro League side Club NXT.

Club career

LA Galaxy II
Cuevas signed with USL Championship side LA Galaxy II on April 30, 2019. Following the 2021 season, Cuevas was released by the Galaxy.

Personal life
Born in the United States, Cuevas is of Mexican descent.

Honors
United States U20
CONCACAF U-20 Championship: 2022

References

External links 
 LA Galaxy profile

2003 births
Living people
American soccer players
United States men's youth international soccer players
American sportspeople of Mexican descent
Association football defenders
LA Galaxy II players
Club NXT players
People from Los Angeles
Soccer players from California
Sportspeople from Los Angeles County, California
USL Championship players
United States men's under-20 international soccer players
American expatriate sportspeople in Belgium
American expatriate soccer players
Expatriate footballers in Belgium